Vladimír Morávek (born 9 April 1965 in Moravský Krumlov) is a Czech theatre, film and television director, screenwriter and actor. His 2003 film Boredom in Brno won five Czech Lions. Between 1996 and 2005 he was art director of Klicperovo divadlo in Hradec Králové. Since 2005 he is the art director of Divadlo Husa na provázku.

Selected filmography

External links
 

1965 births
Living people
People from Moravský Krumlov
Czech film directors
Czech theatre directors
Czech screenwriters
Male screenwriters